Sam Price (born October 1, 1942) is a former professional American football player who played running back for the Miami Dolphins. He was drafted with the first pick of the eleventh round of the AFL draft and played as a reserve running back and fullback for the 1966-1968 seasons.

References

1943 births
People from St. Clair County, Alabama
American football running backs
Miami Dolphins players
Illinois Fighting Illini football players
Living people
American Football League players